Ali Kafi (ALA-LC: ʿAlī Kāfī; 7 October 1928 – 16 April 2013) was an Algerian politician who was Chairman of the High Council of State and acting President from 1992 to 1994.

Early life
Ali Kafi was born in El Harrouch in 1928.

Career
Ali Kafi was one of the major figures of the Algerian underground forces that fought for independence from France from 1954 to 1962. At that time he was promoted to the rank of colonel. Kafi was the Algerian ambassador to several countries, including Syria, Egypt, Iraq and Italy.

He served as the chairman of the High Council of State (a military-backed collective presidency) of Algeria from 2 July 1992 to 31 January 1994. He was selected as chairman after the assassination of Muhammad Boudiaf.

The Council of State was intended as a transitional government during the civil war. The purpose of the council of state was to redirect the nation towards prosperity. The councils hard work was tarnished by the following president after Liamine Zeroual, Abdel Aziz Bouteflika, amidst corruption charges.

Death and burial

Kafi died at the age of 84 on 16 April 2013 in Geneva, Switzerland. His body was buried at El-Alia cemetery.

Honours

National honour
  Grand Master of the National Order of Merit

References

1928 births
2013 deaths
Presidents of Algeria
National Liberation Front (Algeria) politicians
Members of the National Liberation Front (Algeria)
People from Skikda Province
Ambassadors of Algeria to Egypt
Ambassadors of Algeria to Italy
Ambassadors of Algeria to Syria
Ambassadors of Algeria to Iraq
Burials in Algeria
21st-century Algerian people